A measurement tower or measurement mast, also known as meteorological tower or meteorological mast (met tower or met mast), is a free standing tower or a removed mast, which carries measuring instruments with meteorological instruments, such as thermometers and instruments to measure wind speed. Measurement towers are an essential component of rocket launching sites, since one must know exact wind conditions for an execution of a rocket launch. Met masts are crucial in the development of wind farms, as precise knowledge of the wind speed is necessary to know how much energy will be produced, and whether the turbines will survive on the site. Measurement towers are also used in other contexts, for instance near nuclear power stations, and by ASOS stations.

Examples

Meteorology

Other measurement towers
 Aerial test facility Brück, Brück, Germany
 BREN Tower, Nevada Test Site, USA

Wind farm development

Before developers construct a wind farm, they first measure the wind resource on a prospective site by erecting temporary measurement towers. Typically these mount anemometers at a range of heights up to the hub height of the proposed wind turbines, and log the wind speed data at frequent intervals (e.g. every ten minutes) for at least one year and preferably two or more. The data allow the developer to determine if the site is economically viable for a wind farm, and to choose wind turbines optimized for the local wind speed distribution.

See also
Automatic weather station#Mast
Guyed mast
Radio masts and towers
Truss tower

References

Meteorological instrumentation and equipment
Towers